Matthew Cottle (born 16 February 1967) is an English film, stage, radio and television actor. He is best known for his role in Citizen Khan as Dave.

Early life
Cottle was born in Henley-on-Thames, Oxfordshire, and studied drama at the Royal Academy of Dramatic Art.

Film
Cottle appeared in Richard Attenborough's 1992 Chaplin (as Stan Laurel), and in David Jones' 1999 adaptation of A Christmas Carol. Cottle also appeared in The Personal History of David Copperfield in 2019.

Theatre
Cottle's recent theatre work includes The Deep Blue Sea and The Chalk Garden at Chichester Festival Theatre, Wonderland at the Nottingham Playhouse,  How the Other Half Loves at the Haymarket Theatre and the Duke of York's, Our Country's Good, A Small Family Business  The Habit of Art at the National Theatre and Quartermaine's Terms, directed by Richard Eyre, at Wyndham's Theatre. Cottle also appeared in A Chorus Of Disapproval, directed by Trevor Nunn (Harold Pinter Theatre), and Comic Potential, directed by Alan Ayckbourn (Lyric Theatre).  

Other theatre roles include Communicating Doors Menier Chocolate Factory Neighbourhood Watch (in Scarborough and New York), Racing Demon (Sheffield Crucible), Taking Steps (Orange Tree, Richmond), What the Women Did at the Southwark Playhouse and several tours and seasons at repertory theatres up and down the country.

Television
Cottle has appeared as a regular in a number of television series, including Murder on the Blackpool Express, two series of The Windsors for Channel 4, three series as Martin in BBC Two's flat-share sitcom Game On and four series of Citizen Khan. He has also appeared as a regular in several other series, including Fried, Get Well Soon, A Perfect State and Life Begins.

Cottle has also appeared in many other TV shows, including Endeavour for ITV, Defending the Guilty for BBC2, Outlander for Amazon Prime, Pure for Channel 4, Plebs for ITV 2, Unforgotten for ITV, The Dresser, Channel 4's Man Down, Dave's  comedy series Hoff the Record, The Job Lot, Holby City. Doctors and Pramface.

Personal life
He is an Arsenal supporter and has two children, a daughter, Hannah, born in 1997 and a son, Harry, born in 2000.

Filmography

References

External links

Living people
1967 births
Alumni of RADA
English male film actors
English male stage actors
English male television actors
Male actors from Oxfordshire
People from Henley-on-Thames
People educated at Redroofs Theatre School